Rufus King Garland Jr. (May 22, 1830 – December 12, 1886) was a prominent Arkansas politician.

He was born in Tipton County, Tennessee, the older brother of Augustus Hill Garland. He later moved to Arkansas and served in the state legislature from 1858 to 1861. He served in the Confederate States Army and represented the state in the Second Confederate Congress from 1864 to 1865.

External links
Biography at Political Graveyard

1830 births
1886 deaths
Members of the Confederate House of Representatives from Arkansas
19th-century American politicians
People from Tipton County, Tennessee
Confederate States Army officers